The Dillwyn Correctional Center  is a state prison for men located in Dillwyn, Buckingham County, Virginia, United States. It is owned and operated by the Virginia Department of Corrections.  

The facility was opened in 1993 and has a daily working population of 1106 inmates, held at a range of security levels.  The state's Buckingham Correctional Center is nearby. 
Dillwyn Correctional center specializes in parole violators and also has a Metal shop.

References

Prisons in Virginia
Buildings and structures in Buckingham County, Virginia
1993 establishments in Virginia